Umaru Mohammed was appointed Governor of North-Western State in Nigeria in July 1975 at the start of the military regime of General Murtala Mohammed. In February 1976 North-Western State was split into Niger State and Sokoto State. Umaru Mohammed continued as Governor of Sokoto State until July 1978.

Umaru Mohammed died on 26 May 1980 in a crash of an Air Force Fokker F27 on the way to São Tomé and Príncipe on a diplomatic mission.
He was travelling in place of his professional friend Ibrahim Babangida, who had just been approved to travel to the United States for professional training.

References

Nigerian generals
Living people
Nigerian military governors of Sokoto State
Year of birth missing (living people)